Baiyun Hotel is a hotel in Guangzhou, China. Standing 93.5 meters tall, and 117 meters with antenna, with 34 floors, it surpassed Guangzhou Hotel to be the tallest building in the country upon its completion in 1976 and remained so until 1981 when Jinling Hotel of Nanjing, 110 meters, was built. If including antenna, it was still the tallest until 1985 when it was surpassed by Guomao Building in Shenzhen.

See also
 List of tallest buildings in Guangzhou

References

Skyscrapers in Guangzhou
Skyscraper hotels in Guangzhou
Hotels established in 1976
Hotel buildings completed in 1976